Hypolycaena dubia, the dubious fairy hairstreak, is a butterfly in the family Lycaenidae. It is found in Guinea, Sierra Leone, Liberia, Ivory Coast, Ghana, Togo, Nigeria (the southern part of the country and the Cross River loop), Cameroon, the Republic of the Congo, the Central African Republic, the Democratic Republic of the Congo (from the southern part of the country to Shaba and the north-east) and Uganda. The habitat consists of forests.

References

Die Gross-Schmetterlinge der Erde 13: Die Afrikanischen Tagfalter. Plate XIII 68 b

Butterflies described in 1895
Hypolycaenini
Butterflies of Africa